Cathy Lynne Bursey-Sabourin  (born 1957) is a Canadian designer and heraldic artist.

She launched her career as a commercial and graphic designer in St. John's and Ottawa. Her involvement with heraldic art began at the Department of National Defence. In 1989 she was appointed as Fraser Herald at the Canadian Heraldic Authority in Ottawa. She is the principal artist of the Authority and the first woman to hold a state herald appointment in the Commonwealth. Cathy Bursey-Sabourin has been responsible for the paintings made for the arms of the last five Governors General of Canada and the Coat of arms of Canada.

Designed by her the maple leaf emblem symbolizing Ottawa, in an arrangement with two smaller leaves representing the two sciences - genealogy and heraldry - was an official emblem of the 22nd International Congress of Genealogical and Heraldic Sciences held in 1996 in Ottawa.
She provided detailed artwork for the new insignia of the Victoria Cross.

In 2005 Bursey-Sabourin designed the Governor General's Northern Medal. From fall 2010 she worked with a team of designers that created the Canadian Queen Elizabeth II Platinum Jubilee Emblem.

Bursey-Sabourin was appointed a Member of the Royal Victorian Order (MVO) in the 2023 New Year Honours.

See also
Herald
Royal Heraldry Society of Canada

References

Canadian officers of arms
Heraldic artists
Canadian Heraldic Authority
Canadian women painters
Fellows of the Royal Heraldry Society of Canada
Living people
1957 births
21st-century Canadian women artists
Canadian Members of the Royal Victorian Order